The Arnhem–Nijmegen railway is an important railway line in the Netherlands running from Arnhem to Nijmegen, passing through Elst. The line was opened in 1879. It crosses two branches of the river Rhine: the Nederrijn in Arnhem, and the Waal in Nijmegen.

Stations
The main interchange stations on the Arnhem–Nijmegen railway are:

Arnhem: to Amsterdam, Utrecht, Zutphen, Tiel and Oberhausen
Nijmegen: to 's-Hertogenbosch and Venlo

Railway lines in the Netherlands
Standard gauge railways in the Netherlands
Railway lines opened in 1879